Social Capital, formerly known as Social+Capital Partnership, is a venture capital firm based in Palo Alto, California. The firm specializes in technology startups, providing seed funding, venture capital, and private equity.

The firm has "stood out strategically", according to Fortune, "with a focus on ... healthcare, financial services and education ... when those fields were ... neglected by the VC community."

History
Social Capital was founded in 2011 by Chamath Palihapitiya, who had previously worked at Facebook. Mamoon Hamid and Ted Maidenberg also joined the firm that year as General Partners.

In January 2015, Fortune reported that Kleiner Perkins was in acquisition talks with Social Capital, but the acquisition reportedly fell through. In May 2015, Social Capital raised $600 million in their third and largest venture capital fund. PayPal cofounder Peter Thiel praised Palihapitiya's approach, and as of 2015 served as a limited partner.

In 2017, Marc Mezvinsky joined Social Capital as vice chairman as it sought to expand beyond traditional venture capital.

In August 2017, Hamid left Social Capital to join Kleiner Perkins as a general partner and managing member.

In spring of 2018, Mezvinsky departed Social Capital. Later in 2018, then-partners Arjun Sethi, Jonathan Hsu, and Ted Maidenberg left the firm to co-found Tribe Capital.

Investments
Social Capital invested in Yammer in 2011, which was later bought by Microsoft. In 2012, the firm invested in Impermium, which was acquired by Google in 2014. Also in 2012, the firm was a venture investor in InstaEDU, acquired by Chegg in 2014. Social Capital led a round of Series B funding for Wave Accounting. In 2014, Social Capital also invested in LotusFlare.

In May 2015, the firm was a leading investor in a funding round for Slack Technologies.

Through 2016 and 2017, the firm began a Discover program which led to several investments in climate-related companies Aclima, UrbanFootprint, and DroneSeed, and space technology companies Swarm Technologies and Relativity Space.

In September 2020, their SPAC IPOB merged with Opendoor Technologies with a market cap of $4.8 billion.

References

External links

Venture capital firms of the United States
Companies based in Palo Alto, California
Financial services companies established in 2011
2011 establishments in California